The Uzbekistan Liberal Democratic Party (UzLiDeP) (OʻzLiDeP) is a political party in Uzbekistan and the country's ruling party. The four other parties in the Oliy Majlis, Uzbekistan's parliament, are pro-government.

History 
The party was founded in 2003 by Islam Karimov as a split from People's Democratic Party of Uzbekistan, which was led by Karimov from 1991 to until 1996, at which point Karimov stepped down and resigned his membership.

Despite self-identifying with different ideologies, the parties are seen as no different from each other, with the Uzbekistan Liberal Democratic Party being created to give an illusion of a competitive multi-party system; this is supported by the fact that the People's Democratic Party of Uzbekistan has remained supportive of Karimov's policies and retained his favor.

Ideology 
As the party of the middle class and private property owners, as well as businesspeople, farmers, and the service sector, it promotes economic liberalism and economic liberalization, having liberalized the foreign currency market. The party is nominally liberal and promotes liberal democratic values; however, its liberal practice on economic issues has not been reflected in practice at the political level, as it has ruled an authoritarian state, despite reforms following the death of long-time leader Islam Karimov in 2016.

Electoral history 
During the 2004–05 Uzbek parliamentary election, the party won 41 out of 120 seats. In the 2009–10 Uzbek parliamentary election, it won 55 out of 150. It has allied with the Uzbekistan National Revival Democratic Party, a conservative and right-wing party.

In October, the party said that it intended to nominate President Islam Karimov as its candidate in the 2007 Uzbek presidential election, although many considered Karimov to be legally ineligible to run for another term. On 6 November, Karimov was unanimously chosen as the party's presidential candidate at a party convention in Tashkent, and Karimov accepted the nomination. Karimov remained the president until his death in 2016. After the death of Karimov, long-time prime minister and party member Shavkat Mirziyoyev won the 2016 Uzbek presidential election to finish out Karimov's term. Mirziyoyev was re-elected in the 2021 Uzbek presidential election.

Presidential elections

Legislative Chamber elections

References

Sources

External links 
 Official website

Political parties established in 2003
Political parties in Uzbekistan